Graham Goode (born 16 March 1949) is a British horse racing commentator best known for his long association with ITV and Channel 4.

Commentary career
Goode first became a racecourse commentator aged 18 in 1967, and from the end of 1969 onwards he made occasional broadcasts for ITV (mostly during The ITV Seven, a part of World of Sport). By the late 1970s, he was broadcasting regularly for the commercial network, but was still their third-choice commentator behind John Penney and Raleigh Gilbert. From the beginning of 1981, he became ITV's main commentator, remaining in this role (though on Channel 4 from the mid-1980s onwards) until New Year's Eve 1999 at Cheltenham. Simon Holt assumed the number one position during the broadcast at Uttoxeter on 2 January 2000. He retired on New Year's Eve 2010 after calling his final winner at Uttoxeter.

During this period he commentated on 95 consecutive Classics, from the 1981 1,000 Guineas to the 1999 St Leger, a run of Classic commentaries only beaten by BBC Radio veteran Peter Bromley. He also covered many other important events for Channel 4, including the Eclipse Stakes, Whitbread Gold Cup, King George VI Chase, the York Ebor Festival and, from 1995, the Cheltenham Festival, as well as international races such as the Prix de l'Arc de Triomphe, Prix du Jockey Club, the Breeders' Cup and the Arlington Million. He continued as a racecourse commentator throughout this period, covering races such as the Grand National which were televised by BBC Sport.

His most memorable commentaries included his anguished "but oh! so much to do" when Dancing Brave struggled to make up ground on Shahrastani in the 1986 Epsom Derby and his near-hysterical excitement at Desert Orchid's fourth King George VI Chase at Kempton Park in 1990.

Since 2000, when Simon Holt replaced him as Channel 4's main race commentator, he had taken a lower-profile role, continuing to work for Channel 4 as a secondary commentator and also maintaining his career as a racecourse commentator, but now generally on lower-profile races.

References

1949 births
Living people
English sports broadcasters
British horse racing writers and broadcasters